Anna Taylor may refer to:

Anna Diggs Taylor (1932–2017), United States District Judge for the United States District Court for the Eastern District of Michigan
Anna Taylor (writer) (born 1982), author from New Zealand
Anna Heyward Taylor (1879–1956), painter and printmaker

See also 
 Ann Taylor (disambiguation)
 Annie Taylor (disambiguation)